Indian Institute of Chemical Biology (IICB) is a biomedical research centre in Kolkata, West Bengal, India.  

Established in 1935 as Indian Institute of Experimental Medicine (IIEM), it was inducted under the aegis of Council of Scientific & Industrial Research (CSIR) in 1956 and renamed to its present form in 1982. It has 6 R&D divisions:- Cancer Biology & Inflammatory Disorder, Cell Biology & Physiology, Chemistry, Infectious Diseases & Immunology, Molecular & Human Genetics, and Structural Biology & Bioinformatics.

References

External links
  

 

Scientific organisations based in India
Council of Scientific and Industrial Research
Research institutes established in 1935
Research institutes in Kolkata
Research institutes in West Bengal
1935 establishments in India